The Otto Huechling House is a historic house in Mimbres, New Mexico. It was built in 1917 by Otto Huechling, who came to New Mexico as a homesteader in the 1870s. It was designed with a central hall plan and a hipped roof. It has been listed on the National Register of Historic Places since May 16, 1988.

It is adjacent to the Dr. Granville Wood House, another listed house.

It was listed on the National Register as part of a 1988 study of historic resources in the Mimbres Valley of Grant County.

References

Houses on the National Register of Historic Places in New Mexico
National Register of Historic Places in Grant County, New Mexico